Samantha Smith (1972–1985) was an American schoolgirl and peace activist.

Samantha Smith may also refer to:

Samantha Smith (tennis) (born 1971), English tennis player
Samantha Smith (actress) (born 1969), American actress
Samantha Smith (gymnast) (born 1992), Canadian trampoline gymnast
Samantha Quigley Smith (born 1988), American head basketball coach of the SIU Edwardsville Cougars women's basketball team
Samantha Savage Smith, Canadian singer-songwriter

See also
Sam Smith (disambiguation)